The Derjon is a stream in South Tyrol, Italy.

References
Civic Network of South Tyrol 

Rivers of South Tyrol
Rivers of Italy